Ali Eren Demirezen (born 2 April 1990) is a Turkish professional boxer who held the WBO European heavyweight title from 2018 to 2019. As an amateur he won a silver medal at the 2013 Mediterranean Games in Mersin, Turkey.

Amateur career 
At the 2013 AIBA World Boxing Championships in Almaty, Kazakhstan, he was eliminated already in the first round.

In 2015, he competed at the European Amateur Boxing Championships in Samokov, Bulgaria. He was eliminated in the quarterfinals, however, was qualified to participate at the AIBA World Boxing Championships the same year. He was defeated by Joe Joyce from England in the Section 2 quarterfinals of the 2015 AIBA World Boxing Championships in Doha, Qatar.

He earned a quota spot for 2016 Summer Olympics after taking a bronze medal at the 2016 European Boxing Olympic Qualification Tournament in Samsun, Turkey.

Professional boxing record

References

External links 
 
 
 
 
 

1990 births
Sportspeople from Samsun
Turkish male boxers
Super-heavyweight boxers
Fenerbahçe boxers
Living people
Boxers at the 2016 Summer Olympics
Olympic boxers of Turkey
Mediterranean Games silver medalists for Turkey
Competitors at the 2013 Mediterranean Games
Mediterranean Games medalists in boxing
Boxers at the 2015 European Games
European Games competitors for Turkey
21st-century Turkish people